The highlight of the 1997–98 St. Louis Blues season would mark an end of an era as former captain Brett Hull was not re-signed following the season.

Off-season
In his first full season as head coach, Joel Quenneville decided to employ a defensive formula. The move worked wonders as even Brett Hull bought into the new system as the Blues finished in third place with a solid 45–29–8 record. In the first round of the playoffs, the Blues would sweep the Los Angeles Kings in four games. In the second round, the Blues were eliminated by the Detroit Red Wings in six games. The season would mark an end of an era, as Brett Hull was not signed to a new contract after the season, joining the Dallas Stars as a free agent during the summer.

Defenseman Chris Pronger was named team captain, a role that had been vacant during the previous season.

Regular season

The Blues were one of only two teams out the NHL's 26 to score at least 3 goals per game (The Detroit Red Wings were the other team). The Blues' 256 goals for led all teams.

Final standings

Schedule and results

Playoffs

Player statistics

Regular season
Scoring

Goaltending

Playoffs
Scoring

Goaltending

Awards and records

Transactions

Draft picks
St. Louis's draft picks at the 1997 NHL Entry Draft held at the Civic Arena in Pittsburgh, Pennsylvania.

See also
 1997–98 NHL season

References
 Blues on Hockey Database

S
S
St. Louis Blues seasons
St
St